Cophixalus bewaniensis is a species of frog in the family Microhylidae. It is endemic to Mount Menawa in the Bewani Mountains, West Sepik Province, mainland Papua New Guinea. The specific name refers to its type locality.

Description
No other specimens are known. The snout is truncate. The tympanum is very indistinct and there is a weak supratympanic fold. The eyes are moderately large. The fingers and the toes bear small discs, except for the first finger that is greatly reduced and lacks a disc. The first toe is also reduced but bears a tiny disc. No webbing is present. The dorsum has reddish-tan ground color. There is a large, black blotch behind the forearm.

Habitat and conservation
There are no known threats to this little known species. The type locality is outside protected areas.

References

bewaniensis
Amphibians of Papua New Guinea
Endemic fauna of Papua New Guinea
Endemic fauna of New Guinea
Amphibians described in 2000
Taxonomy articles created by Polbot